Micronychia tsiramiramy is a species of flowering plant in the family Anacardiaceae, native to Madagascar.

References

Anacardiaceae
Endemic flora of Madagascar
Plants described in 1944
Taxa named by Joseph Marie Henry Alfred Perrier de la Bâthie